Stephen Higginson (November 28, 1743November 28, 1828) was an American merchant and shipmaster from Boston, Massachusetts. He was a delegate for Massachusetts to the Continental Congress in 1783.  He took an active part in suppressing Shays' Rebellion, was the author of the Laco letters (1789), and served the United States government as navy agent from May 11 to June 22, 1798.  Although he was a privateer during the American Revolutionary War he became a "blue light", extreme-Federalist during the War of 1812 and was one of the members of the Essex Junto.

References

External links
Higginson’s Congressional biography
Life and Times of Stephen Higginson: Member of the Continental Congress, by Thomas Wentworth Higginson, published 1907..
 

1743 births
1828 deaths
People from colonial Boston
Continental Congressmen from Massachusetts
18th-century American politicians
People of colonial Massachusetts
Massachusetts Federalists
Colonial American merchants
American privateers
Burials in Boston